"Exploration Earth: The Time Machine" is an episode of the BBC Schools radio drama series Exploration Earth, a series exploring geography. It was the third episode in this series. As it was an educational programme, it used the Doctor Who format and elements to explore the processes of the creation of the Earth. It was recorded on 27 April 1976 with Tom Baker and Elisabeth Sladen reprising their TV roles as the Doctor and Sarah Jane. Joining them was John Westbrook as Megron, High Lord of Chaos.

It was broadcast on 4 October 1976 on BBC Radio 4.

CD release
Exploration Earth: The Time Machine was released on CD, paired with Genesis of the Daleks, in 2001. It was also given away on its own as a free CD with the 28 April 2010 edition of The Daily Telegraph newspaper via WHSmith. It was re-released on CD in The BBC Radio Episodes but this time paired with What Happened to...Susan?, a 1994 spoof from the radio comedy series What Happened to...?

External links

Fourth Doctor audio plays
Radio plays based on Doctor Who
1976 radio dramas